AABN or AABn may refer to:
 Anti-Apartheid Beweging Nederland, a Dutch anti-apartheid movement that was active in the 1960s
 African Aurora Business Network, an African enterprise development NGO
 Several military units of the United States Marine Corps:
 2nd Assault Amphibian Battalion
 3rd Assault Amphibian Battalion
 4th Assault Amphibian Battalion
 Assault Armor Battalion, a military unit of the Philippine Marine Corps